Stanley B. Stanyar (December 29, 1905 – June 5, 1983) was a Canadian rower who competed in the 1932 Summer Olympics.

In 1932, he won the bronze medal as member of the Canadian boat in the eights competition.

External links
 Stanley Stanyar's profile at Sports Reference.com

1905 births
1983 deaths
Canadian male rowers
Olympic bronze medalists for Canada
Olympic rowers of Canada
Rowers at the 1932 Summer Olympics
Olympic medalists in rowing
Medalists at the 1932 Summer Olympics